David P. Pierson  (August 20, 1855 – November 11, 1922) was an American Major League Baseball player who played catcher and outfield for the Cincinnati Reds of the National League in 1876. His brother, Dick Pierson, also played professional baseball.

References

External links

1855 births
1922 deaths
19th-century baseball players
Baseball players from Pennsylvania
Sportspeople from Wilkes-Barre, Pennsylvania
Major League Baseball catchers
Major League Baseball outfielders
Cincinnati Reds (1876–1879) players
Newark Domestics players